The Dreme is a poem written in 1528 by Scottish herald and poet David Lyndsay. It is his earliest surviving poem, and is an allegorical lament on the misgovernment of the realm.

References

External links
 Includes full text of The Dreme on pp 29-39
Full text of The Dreme in Scottish Poetry of the Sixteenth Century at archive.org

Further reading

Scottish poems
1528 poems